The Dallas Jackals are a Major League Rugby team that began play in the 2022 season as an expansion franchise. They were originally going to join the MLR for the 2021 season, but on January 19, 2021, the Jackals delayed their inaugural season to 2022. The team is owned by an investment group including Neil Leibman of the Texas Rangers and Top Tier Sports. The team is based in Arlington, Texas, playing at Choctaw Stadium.

On July 21, 2022, the team introduced Santiago Sodini as the team's new General Manager.

Sponsorship

Roster

The Dallas Jackals squad for the 2023 Major League Rugby season is:

 Senior 15s internationally capped players are listed in bold.
 MLR teams are allowed to field up to ten overseas players per match.

Head coach
  Michael Hodge (2021–present)

Assistant coach
  Aaron Jarvis (2022–)

Captains

  Calvin Gentry (2021)
  Chris Pennell (2022–)
  Dylan Bower (Vice Captain) (2022)

Records

Season standings

2022 season

Regular season

References

External links
 

 

Dallas Jackals
Major League Rugby teams
Rugby union teams in Texas
Sports teams in the Dallas–Fort Worth metroplex
2021 establishments in Texas
Rugby clubs established in 2020